The Wraith is a 1986 independently made American action-fantasy film, produced by John Kemeny, written and directed by Mike Marvin, and starring Charlie Sheen, Sherilyn Fenn, Nick Cassavetes, and Randy Quaid. The film was theatrically released November 21, 1986 on just 88 screens in the United States by New Century Vista Film Company (later New Century Entertainment Corporation).

Plot
In the town of Brooks, Arizona, Packard Walsh, the leader of a gang of car thieves, coerces people with fast cars into racing with the winner of the race taking ownership of the loser's car. Packard controls everyone through intimidation including Keri Johnson, whom he views as his property. Keri's boyfriend, Jamie Hankins, was the victim of an unsolved murder and Keri, who was with him, has no memory of the traumatic event.

Jake Kesey arrives in Brooks riding a dirt bike. He befriends Billy Hankins (Jamie's brother) and Keri. While swimming at a river, Jake is shown to have knife scars on his neck and back.

Packard's control of the illegal races comes to an end when an all-black Dodge M4S Turbo Interceptor supercar appears with a driver covered head-to-toe in black body armor and helmet, and metal braces resembling those worn by victims of physical trauma. The driver challenges Packard's gang to a race, ending in high-speed, explosive crashes in which two gang members are both killed. Their bodies appear unharmed afterwards except for burned-out eye sockets. The Turbo Interceptor then reconstructs itself and eludes the pursuing Sheriff Loomis in a cloud of glowing light.

Two more gang members, Skank and Gutterboy, are killed when the Turbo Interceptor races through the gang's warehouse, causing an explosion. With Packard's gang mostly gone, Rughead, the gang's tech-geek, figures out why the gang had been targeted. When Loomis arrives at the scene of the destruction, Rughead tells him Packard and his gang had murdered Jamie Hankins.

After Packard witnesses Keri kissing Jake, he kidnaps her and beats up Billy when he tries to intervene. When Packard tries driving to California, Keri resists. As he exits the car and pulls a knife on her, the Turbo Interceptor arrives and challenges Packard to a race. Packard accepts and is then killed in an explosive head-on collision with the Turbo Interceptor, like the rest of his gang were. Loomis calls off the hunt for the mysterious driver, believing it to be futile.

As Keri arrives home that night, the Turbo Interceptor pulls up and Jake emerges. Keri realizes that Jake is a revived form of her dead boyfriend Jamie, who had returned for a chance to rekindle their past relationship. He then asks her to wait for him because he has one last thing to do. Jake then gives his car to Billy. When Billy asks who he is Jake says that Billy already knows and as he rides off on his dirt bike, Billy realizes Jake is Jamie. Jake picks up Keri, whom Loomis is watching from a distance. Together they ride off along the desert highway into the moonlight.

Cast
 Charlie Sheen as Jake Kesey / The Wraith / Jamie Hankins
 Matthew Barry as Billy Hankins
 Sherilyn Fenn as Keri Johnson
 Randy Quaid as Sheriff G.L. Loomis
 Clint Howard as "Rughead"
 Nick Cassavetes as Packard Walsh
 David Sherrill as Maurice "Skank"
 Jamie Bozian as "The Gutterboy"
 Griffin O'Neal as Oggie Fisher
 Chris Nash as "Minty"
 Christopher Bradley as Jamie Hankins
 Vickie Benson as The Waitress
 Jeffrey Sudzin as "Redd", Skank's uncle
 Peder Melhuse as Deputy Murphy
 Michael Hundrtford as Deputy Stokes
 Dick Alexander as Deputy Sandeval
 Steven Eckholdt as George, Boy In Daytona
 Elizabeth Cox as Girl In Daytona
 Joan H. Reynolds as Policewoman

Production

Shooting locations
The Wraith was shot entirely in and around Tucson, Arizona; shots of the hilly road leading into the fictional "Brooks, AZ" were filmed on Freeman Road on the city's south side. Keri's (Sherilyn Fenn) home is located at 2128 East 5th Street; however, "Big Kay's Burgers" was a set built especially for the film at 2755 East Benson Highway, and it no longer exists.

Sheriff Loomis goes to talk to Skank and Gutterboy at the Davis-Monthan Air Force Base, at the airplane graveyard where they both work. The film's swimming hole is located in Sabino Canyon, off North Upper Sabino Canyon Road. The curvy mountain road where Packard and his gang challenge other cars to deadly races is the General Hitchcock/Catalina/Mount Lemmon Highway that winds through natural stone monoliths north of the city. Skank and Gutterboy chase after Jamie and Keri down North 4th Avenue at East 7th Street. The portion of the chase that leads into a tunnel is the since-redone tunnel on North 4th Avenue, where it crosses under railroad tracks; Jake and Keri are seen riding down the road through Sabino Canyon Recreation Area (near Sabino Lake Dam) northeast of Tucson.

Bruce Ingram, a camera operator, died during the filming of one of the car chases; another crew member was seriously injured.

Turbo Interceptor
The Dodge M4S Turbo Interceptor used in the film was originally a pace car built by Chrysler Corporation and PPG Industries. Six copies were made for use in the film: two stunt cars made from molds of the original car and four non-drivable "dummies" that were destroyed during filming. During production, the real Dodge Turbo Interceptor was used in close-ups. That original was located at the Walter P. Chrysler Museum in Auburn Hills, MI until 2016, when the museum closed permanently.

Soundtrack

The music score was composed and performed by Michael Hoenig and J. Peter Robinson, two famous synth composers of film and TV series Soundtracks. The soundtrack LP was recorded by Rick Hart and entirely played on a NED Synclavier II.

Many famous 1980s rock music hits are included on the film's soundtrack:
 Tim Feehan – "Where's the Fire"
 Ozzy Osbourne – "Secret Loser"
 Stan Bush – "Hearts vs. Heads"
 Ian Hunter – "Wake Up Call"
 Mötley Crüe – "Smokin' in the Boys Room"
 Robert Palmer – "Addicted to Love"
 Nick Gilder – "Scream of Angels"
 Lion – "Power Love"
 Honeymoon Suite – "Those Were the Days"
 Lion – "Never Surrender"
 Bonnie Tyler – "Matter of the Heart"
 Mark Tiemans – "Hold on Blue Eyes"
 Billy Idol – "Rebel Yell"
 Jill Michaels – "Young Love, Hot Love"
 James House – "Bad Mistake"

Release
The Wraith was released in the United States on November 21, 1986. In the Philippines, the film was released as Black Moon Rising: Part-2 on April 29, 1987, connecting it to the unrelated film Black Moon Rising starring Tommy Lee Jones. In Germany, it was released on June 11, 1987, under the title "Interceptor - Phantom der Ewigkeit" (Interceptor - Phantom of Eternity).

Critical response
The Wraith received mixed reviews from critics. Film historian and critic Leonard Maltin dismissed the film as "... for those who favor fast cars and lots of noise." In the Time Out review, editor John Pym saw The Wraith having "comic-strip killer car thieves" with "...the best joke having one of the thugs knowing the word 'wraith.'"

Following its theatrical run, the film was featured on television in an episode of Cinema Insomnia.

Home video
In 1987 the film was released to VHS video by Lightning Video, then on LaserDisc by Image Entertainment; it was then released in 2003 on DVD by Platinum Disc Corporation (now Echo Bridge Home Entertainment). In spite of having no special features and only being available in the pan-and-scan format, there is footage retained that was missing on the original VHS and LaserDisc releases. Lionsgate released a widescreen Special Edition DVD on March 2, 2010, which included the previously missing footage.

See also
 List of American films of 1986
 List of film accidents

References

Notes

Bibliography

 Maltin, Leonard. Leonard Maltin's Movie Guide 2009. New York: New American Library, 2009 (originally published as TV Movies, then Leonard Maltin’s Movie & Video Guide), First edition 1969, published annually since 1988. .
 Pym, John, ed. "The Wraith." Time Out Film Guide. London: Time Out Guides Limited, 2004. .

External links

 
 
 
 
 Filming locations for The Wraith
 The Wraith Car – Official Restoration website (loads slowly)
 The Wraith Website – The Wraith Fan Site (Details About DVD/VHS Releases, Photos, Soundtrack and more!)
  The Wraith Videos – The Wraith Videos

1986 films
1986 horror films
1980s science fiction action films
1986 independent films
1980s science fiction horror films
American action horror films
American ghost films
American independent films
American science fiction action films
American science fiction horror films
1980s road movies
American road movies
American films about revenge
Films based on urban legends
American auto racing films
Films set in Pima County, Arizona
Films shot in Tucson, Arizona
Films scored by J. Peter Robinson
Films scored by Michael Hoenig
Superhero horror films
American superhero films
1980s English-language films
1980s American films